Acroloxus egirdirensis is a species of very small freshwater snail, which because of their shape are known as limpets, aquatic pulmonate gastropods in the family Acroloxidae.

Distribution
This freshwater limpet species is endemic to Lake Eğirdir in Turkey. It is found in the shallow waters along the north side of the lake.

Threats
The survival of this species is threatened by the accumulation of pesticides in the lake from surrounding orchards, as well as by soil erosion leading to siltation.

References

Acroloxidae
Gastropods described in 2012
Vulnerable animals
Endemic fauna of Turkey